Paul Stoeken (born January 9, 1975) is a windsurfer who represented the United States Virgin Islands. He competed at the 1996 Summer Olympics and the 2000 Summer Olympics in the Mistral One Design class.

References

External links
 
 

1975 births
Living people
United States Virgin Islands male sailors (sport)
Olympic sailors of the United States Virgin Islands
Sailors at the 1996 Summer Olympics – Mistral One Design
Sailors at the 2000 Summer Olympics – Mistral One Design
St. Mary's Seahawks sailors
People from Englewood, New Jersey
Sportspeople from Bergen County, New Jersey